Stefano Pesce (born 19 October 1967, Bologna) is an Italian actor and author.

Filmography

References

External links

Stefano Pesce Official Site
Stefano Pesce Tribute YouTube

1967 births
Living people
20th-century Italian male actors
21st-century Italian male actors
Italian male film actors
Italian male television actors